Montoro is an Italian comune (municipality) of the province of Avellino, Campania. The municipal seat is in the town of Piano.

History
Following a referendum, the municipality was officially created on 3 December 2013, after the merging of Montoro Inferiore and Montoro Superiore. In 2015, it gains the town status thanks to a presidential decree signed by Sergio Mattarella.

Geography
The municipality is located in the southwestern area of its province, at the borders with the Province of Salerno. It borders with the municipalities of Bracigliano, Calvanico, Contrada, Fisciano, Forino, Mercato San Severino and Solofra.

Transport
The municipality is served by 3 railway stations on the Benevento-Avellino-Salerno line: Montoro-Forino (located in Piano), Borgo, and Montoro Superiore (located between Torchiati and Banzano).

It counts two exits on the RA2 motorway Salerno-Avellino: "Montoro Sud", formerly named "Montoro Inferiore", is located near Piazza di Pandola. "Montoro Nord", formerly "Montoro Superiore", is located near Torchiati.

People
Agostino Cardamone (b. 1965), boxer
Giuseppe De Falco (1908-1955), politician
Lionello De Felice (1916-1989), film director

References

External links

Official website 
Montoro on comuni-italiani.it 
Montoro on tuttaitalia.it 

 
Municipalities of the Province of Avellino
Cities and towns in Campania
2013 establishments in Italy
States and territories established in 2013